The 1952 Penn State Nittany Lions baseball team represented Pennsylvania State University in the 1952 NCAA baseball season. The head coach was Joe Bedenk, serving his 22nd year.

The Nittany Lions lost in the College World Series, defeated by the Holy Cross.

Roster

Schedule 

! style="" | Regular Season
|- valign="top" 

|- align="center" bgcolor="#ccffcc"
| 1 || April 11 || at  || Unknown • Washington, D. C. || 20–1 || 1–0
|- align="center" bgcolor="#ccffcc"
| 2 || April 12 || at  || Unknown • Washington, D. C. || 18–5 || 2–0
|- align="center" bgcolor="#ccffcc"
| 3 || April 12 || at Georgetown || Unknown • Washington, D. C. || 8–4 || 3–0
|- align="center" bgcolor="#ccffcc"
| 4 || April 16 ||  || New Beaver Field • University Park, Pennsylvania || 9–4 || 4–0
|- align="center" bgcolor="#ccffcc"
| 5 || April 19 ||  || New Beaver Field • University Park, Pennsylvania || 4–2 || 5–0
|- align="center" bgcolor="#ccffcc"
| 6 || April 19 || West Virginia || New Beaver Field • University Park, Pennsylvania || 6–2 || 6–0
|- align="center" bgcolor="#ccffcc"
| 7 || April 22 ||  || New Beaver Field • University Park, Pennsylvania || 15–4 || 7–0
|- align="center" bgcolor="#ccffcc"
| 8 || April 26 ||  || New Beaver Field • University Park, Pennsylvania || 5–0 || 8–0
|- align="center" bgcolor="#ccffcc"
| 9 || April 28 ||  || New Beaver Field • University Park, Pennsylvania || 2–1 || 9–0
|-

|- align="center" bgcolor="#ccffcc"
| 10 || May 2 || at  || New Beaver Field • University Park, Pennsylvania || 11–5 || 10–0
|- align="center" bgcolor="#ffcccc"
| 11 || May 5 || at  || McGeehan Field • Villanova, Pennsylvania || 1–12 || 10–1
|- align="center" bgcolor="#ffcccc"
| 12 || May 6 || at  || Unknown • Annapolis, Maryland || 2–4 || 10–2
|- align="center" bgcolor="#ffcccc"
| 13 || May 9 || at  || Unknown • Pittsburgh, Pennsylvania || 6–8 || 10–3
|- align="center" bgcolor="#ccffcc"
| 14 || May 10 || at Pittsburgh || Unknown • Pittsburgh, Pennsylvania || 4–1 || 11–3
|- align="center" bgcolor="#ccffcc"
| 15 || May 16 || at  || Unknown • Carlisle, Pennsylvania || 12–1 || 12–3
|- align="center" bgcolor="#ffcccc"
| 16 || May 17 || at  || River Field • Philadelphia, Pennsylvania || 3–4 || 12–4
|- align="center" bgcolor="#ccffcc"
| 17 || May 21 || at Bucknell || Unknown • Lewisburg, Pennsylvania || 7–4 || 13–4
|-

|-
|-
! style="" | Postseason
|- valign="top"

|- align="center" bgcolor="#ccffcc"
| 18 || June 5 ||  || New Beaver Field • University Park, Pennsylvania || 13–4 || 14–4
|- align="center" bgcolor="#ccffcc"
| 19 || June 6 || Villanova || New Beaver Field • University Park, Pennsylvania || 9–6 || 15–4
|-

|- align="center" bgcolor="#ccffcc"
| 20 || June 12 || vs Texas || Johnny Rosenblatt Stadium • Omaha, Nebraska || 5–3 || 16–4
|- align="center" bgcolor="#ccffcc"
| 21 || June 13 || vs Duke || Johnny Rosenblatt Stadium • Omaha, Nebraska || 12–7 || 17–4
|- align="center" bgcolor="#ffcccc"
| 22 || June 14 || vs Missouri || Johnny Rosenblatt Stadium • Omaha, Nebraska || 2–3 || 17–5
|- align="center" bgcolor="#ffcccc"
| 23 || June 15 || vs Holy Cross || Johnny Rosenblatt Stadium • Omaha, Nebraska || 4–15 || 17–6
|-

|-
|

References 

Penn State Nittany Lions baseball seasons
Penn State Nittany Lions baseball
College World Series seasons
Penn State